Here Is What Is is the fifth studio album by Canadian songwriter and record producer Daniel Lanois. It was first released in December 2007 as a high-quality download, and later released on CD on March 18, 2008.

The album is the result of the same project that led to the 2007 documentary "Here Is What Is" that premiered at the 2007 Toronto International Film Festival in September. The movie documents the aesthetics and creative process behind Lanois' approach to music making and recording. The album has been presented as a direct soundtrack to this film, and some of the tracks ("Beauty" and "Chest of Drawers") are conversations with Brian Eno.

Track listing
All songs written by Daniel Lanois unless otherwise noted.

 "Chest of Drawers"
 "Where Will I Be"
 "Here Is What Is"
 "Not Fighting Anymore"
 "Beauty"
 "Blue Bus"
 "Lovechild"
 "Harry"
 "Bells"
 "This May Be The Last Time"
 "Smoke #6"
 "I Like That"
 "Duo Glide"
 "Bladesteel"
 "Moondog"
 "Sacred and Secular"
 "Joy"
 "Luna Samba"

"Where Will I Be" is a new version of a song which had been previously released on Emmylou Harris' album Wrecking Ball in 1995.

The tracks "Lovechild" and "Sacred and Secular" respectively incorporate  the pedal steel guitar melody used on "Carla", from the Belladonna album, and the guitar melody used on "Transmitter", from tbe Shine album.

Personnel
Daniel Lanois – guitar, bass, vocals
Brian Blade – drums
Garth Hudson – keyboards
Jim Wilson
Daryl Johnson
Tony Mangurian
Tony Garnier
Marcus Blake
Steven Nistor - drums
Ada Small
Shawn Stroope
Willie Green
Aaron Embry 
Brady Blade

References
 
 

Daniel Lanois albums
2007 albums
Albums produced by Daniel Lanois